KKSY-FM (96.5 MHz, "96.5 Kiss Country") is a 100,000 watt radio station in Cedar Rapids, Iowa.  It is a country music formatted station owned by iHeartMedia, Inc.

History
KKSY-FM signed on February 27, 1963, as WMT-FM at 96.5 FM with an easy listening, jazz and classical music format. There were 90-minute classical music segments in the morning and evening with regular programs of jazz and music from Broadway musicals. Some of those early announcers were Keith Webster, Bill Dutcher, Don John Ross, Bill Grubbe, and Jim Wicks as well as other WMT announcers who took the helm of hosting on FM. In the early days, programming was totally separate from WMT radio but in the late 1960s, WMT-FM started simulcasting the 15-minute newscasts of WMT AM 600 several times a day. In the 1970s, it became a full-time "beautiful music" station before adopting an adult contemporary format in 1982, which occurred around the time when many beautiful music stations went to soft rock or more contemporary format. WMT-FM tried competing against KCRG until 1984 when KCRG-AM flipped its format to adult standards. WMT-FM became Cedar Rapids' only AC station for another few years, and was the dominant AC station for the Cedar Rapids market. The amount of adult contemporary stations in the Cedar Rapids market (excluding Waterloo) was upgraded from one to three when WMT-FM's sister station WMT-AM flipped from MOR to adult contemporary in 1986, and KCRG-AM returning back to its adult contemporary format after a nearly three-year hiatus in January 1987. Both WMT-AM and KCRG-AM's adult contemporary formats didn't last long. WMT-FM became the only (and dominant) AC station in the Cedar Rapids market after WMT-AM flipped back to MOR in late 1988 and KCRG-AM flipped to oldies in 1989. WMT-FM's studios have been located at Broadcast Park on Collins Road in Cedar Rapids, along with its AM sister station WMT and TV station KGAN (the former WMT-TV), since it signed on. Until the 1970s, the studios of WMT radio were located on the fifth floor of the historic Paramount Theatre building in downtown Cedar Rapids. It was one of the few stations with a callsign beginning with W located west of the Mississippi River.

The station was known for its "time warp weekends" and long-standing tradition of being heavily involved in the Cedar Rapids community.  The station hosts "Uptown Friday Nights" every Friday night in downtown Cedar Rapids. The station often joins up with WMT for special promotional events, and simulcasts during severe weather conditions.

WMT-FM ended its longtime hot adult contemporary format on December 27, 2011, when Clear Channel transferred the country format from KKSY (95.7 FM); after a temporary simulcast period, 95.7 FM began to simulcast WMT on January 2, 2012 and eventually took the KWMG call letters on January 17, 2012.

References

External links

KSY-FM
Mass media in Cedar Rapids, Iowa
Country radio stations in the United States
Radio stations established in 1963
1963 establishments in Iowa
IHeartMedia radio stations